Leucodon is a genus of mosses belonging to the family Leucodontaceae.

The genus was first described by Christian Friedrich Schwägrichen in 1816.

The genus has cosmopolitan distribution.

References

Hypnales
Moss genera